When Steptoe Met Son is a 2002 Channel 4 documentary about the personal lives of Wilfrid Brambell and Harry H. Corbett, the stars of the long-running BBC situation comedy, Steptoe and Son. It aired on 20 August 2002.

The programme reveals how Brambell and Corbett were highly dissimilar to their on-screen characters. Corbett felt he had a promising career as a serious actor, but was trapped by his role as Harold and forced to keep returning to the series after typecasting limited his choice of work. Brambell, meanwhile, was a homosexual, something that in the 1960s was still frowned upon by traditional English society and, until the Sexual Offences Act 1967, illegal, and was thus driven underground. The documentary went on to claim that during an ill-fated final tour of Australia the already strained relationship between Corbett and Brambell finally broke down for good.

See also
 The Curse of Steptoe

References

External links
 

British television documentaries
Channel 4 original programming
Documentary films about actors
British LGBT-related television films
Steptoe and Son
Documentary films about television
2002 television specials
Documentary films about LGBT topics
2002 LGBT-related films
2002 films
2000s English-language films
2000s British films